Patrick Asadu (born 23 August 1964) is a Nigerian politician and a medical practitioner who hails from Ovoko in Igbo-eze South local government area of Enugu State who is serving as a representative of Nsukka/Igbo-eze south constituency at the Federal House of Representatives. He was appointed an Honourable Commissioner of Enugu State after joining the Peoples Democratic Party (PDP).

Early life 
Asadu was born to the family of Pa David Ezenwa Asadu and the matriarch of the family, Mary Oriefi Asadu (nee Eze-Okwechi), both deceased. He attended Boy's Secondary School, Woko, and in 1982 he passed the West African Examination Council (WASC) with distinctions. Asadu studied medicine and surgery at the University of Nigeria, Nsukka and graduated with an MBBS in 1988. He also obtained a Master's of Public Health from the University of Nigeria, Nsukka. Asadu worked as a medical practitioner in the public and private sectors. Asadu is married.

Political appointments 
Asadu has held several political offices, which include:

 Hon. Commissioner for Sciecnce & Technology, Enugu State – 2001
 Hon. Commissioner for Land and Housing, Enugu State 2000–2001
 Hon. Commissioner for Health Enugu state 2001–2002
 Chairman Transition Committee, Igbo-Eze South LGA 2002–2003
 Hon. Commissioner for Agriculture Enugu State 2003–2005
 Hon. Commissioner for Environment Enugu State 2005–2006

References 

1964 births
Living people
Nigerian politicians
University of Nigeria alumni